Radical Love is the first live album of the Filipino worship band Victory Worship. In February 2015, the album was certified gold by the Philippine Association of the Record Industry for sales of more than 7,500 units.

In June 2015, the song Radical Love was nominated at the 28th Awit Awards for Best Inspirational/Religious Recording.

Radio singles
Three songs from Radical Love were released to local Christian radio for airplay. The carrier single was the title track, sung by Cathy Go. The second single released to radio was "Grace Changes Everything", sung by Lee Brown. The third and final radio single was "Jesus My Savior", sung by Isa Fabregas.

Official music videos
Live performance videos were released on YouTube for the three radio singles from "Radical Love," namely "Grace Changes Everything",  "Jesus My Savior", and the title track. A live performance video was also released for album opener "Faithful". Official lyric videos were also produced for all album tracks except "Shine Upon the Philippines".

Reception
Radical Love was released on digital and CD formats on September 12, 2014. The Philippine Star music columnist, Baby Gil, wrote, "(Radical Love) is a very well-produced pop album of appealing songs that are great to listen to and which also gets you to worship the Lord at the same time." Radio Republic's Zach Lucero wrote, "...those songs we hear on radio are not quite expressed the same way as Radical Love."

Track listing

Awards and nominations

Certifications

References

2014 live albums
Christian music albums by Filipino artists